Bever is a municipality located in the Belgian province of Flemish Brabant. The municipality only comprises the town of Bever proper. It is located in the Pajottenland. On January 1, 2018, Bever had a total population of 2,204. The total area is 19.78 km² which gives a population density of 111 inhabitants per km². It is a Dutch-speaking village with language facilities for French-speakers.

References

External links
 
 Gazetteer Entry

Municipalities of Flemish Brabant